John Greenleaf Cloudman (sometimes referred to as Cloutman) was born in Newburyport, Massachusetts, one of seven children, on December 17, 1813 to David P. Cloudman and Susan D. Cloudman (1792–1858). He died in Bethel, Maine on October 11, 1892. He was a landscape and portrait painter.

Background
Cloudman began his career as a carpenter and sign painter. He decided to become a fine artist. In 1847 he sailed to Paris, France, to study art there for one year. After Paris he went to northern California during the years 1852–53. He was known for having painted the Pomo Indians of California.

Influenced By and Influence On
Cloudman was a protegee of landscape artist Charles Codman. He was the only one of Codman's students to achieve lasting fame as a painter.

Charles F. Kimball, (1831–1903) studied with Cloudman and became his son-in-law when he married Cloudman's daughter Annie in 1863.

Works

Paintings by Cloudman are held in the core collection of the Portland Museum of Art in Maine, Maine Historical Society, Maine State Museum and the Bangor Public Library collection.

References

1813 births
1892 deaths
People from Newburyport, Massachusetts
People from Bethel, Maine
American portrait painters
19th-century American painters
American male painters
Artists from Maine
Artists from Massachusetts
19th-century American male artists